Robin Seager is an English historian. He is an honorary senior research fellow at the School of Archaeology, Classics and Egyptology at the University of Liverpool, UK.

Seager was a reader in classics and ancient history at the University of Liverpool. He has previously lectured at the University of Illinois at Urbana-Champaign and was a visiting research fellow at the University of New England, Armidale and Langford Eminent Scholar Chair at Florida State University, US.

Works
 Tiberius (1972) 
 Ammianus Marcellinus: Seven Studies in His Language and Thought (1986)
 Pompey: a Political Biography (1994)

External links
 Robin Seager publications listed at WorldCat
 Robin Seager biography at University of Liverpool

Living people
English historians
Year of birth missing (living people)